Princessnesian (foaled in 1964 in Kentucky) was an American Thoroughbred racehorse.

Background
Princessnesian was a bay mare bred and raced by William Haggin Perry.

Racing career
In 1968 the four-year-old mare became only the third female to win the Gold Cup, joining Happy Issue (1944) and Two Lea (1952).

Breeding record
Retired to broodmare service, Princessnesian was bred to prominent stallions including Buckpasser, Bold Ruler, Hail To Reason, Hoist The Flag, and Nijinsky. None of her foals achieved anything more than modest success in racing but her daughter Bold Enchantress produced the Group 1 winner Fordham.

Pedigree

References

 Princessnesian's pedigree and partial racing stats

1964 racehorse births
Racehorses bred in Kentucky
Racehorses trained in the United States
Thoroughbred family 4-m